Aussois is a commune in the Vanoise massif, in the Savoie department in the Auvergne-Rhône-Alpes region in south-eastern France. The village is on the border of France's first National Park, the Vanoise National Park. 
Although not as well known as other resorts right on the other side of the mountain like Val Thorens, it is popular with the French as ski resort in winter and as mountain destination in summer.  
At  from Modane, it is ideally located in the Maurienne region with good transport links in and out of Lyon, Geneva, Grenoble and Chambéry. Aussois can also be reached from Turin via the Fréjus Road Tunnel, linking Bardonecchia in Italy and Modane. 
Nearby Gare de Modane is a large railway station with a high-speed service (TGV) Paris - Chambéry - Turin - Milan.
The resort offers  of slopes, 21 slopes (6 Green, 5 Blue, 8 Red, 2 Black).

Geography

Climate

Aussois has a humid continental climate (Köppen climate classification Dfb) closely bordering on a oceanic climate (Cfb).

Image gallery

See also
Communes of the Savoie department

References

External links
 Official site (Visitor center)
 Aussois at Peak Retreats

Communes of Savoie